Henry Kendall High School is a co-educational comprehensive secondary day school, located in Gosford, in the Central Coast region of New South Wales, Australia.

History

Established in January 1970, on the old Faunce Street site which was then a part of Gosford High School, the school enrolled approximately 790 students in 2018, from Year 7 to Year 12; six percent identified as Indigenous Australians and 21 percent were from a language background other than English. The school is operated by the NSW Department of Education; the principal is Andrew Backhouse.

In 2015, long time staff member, teacher and year advisor Gae Hobson retired after thirty years' of service.

See also 

 List of government schools in New South Wales
 Education in Australia

References

Central Coast (New South Wales)
Public high schools in New South Wales
1970 establishments in Australia
Educational institutions established in 1970